Marie-Thérèse Abena Ondoa (nee Obama) is a Cameroonian academic and politician. She has been a Minister of Women's Empowerment and the Family since 2009. She was assistant dean in the Faculty of Medicine of the University of Yaounde before her appointment as Minister.

Academic and medical activities 
Prior to her ministerial appointment, she worked in environments such as universities and hospitals. She was notably a Professor at the Faculty of Medicine, University of Yaoundé I; Vice-Dean of this faculty, in charge of research and cooperation; and Head of the Pediatric Department of the University Teaching Hospital (CHU) of Yaoundé. She was appointed the director of the regional hospital of Yaoundé on March 17, 2009, becoming the first Cameroonian woman to hold this position.

Politics 
In 2009, four months after her appointment as head of the regional hospital in Yaounde, she was appointed Minister of Women's Empowerment and the Family, replacing Suzanne Mbomback; who held this position from 2004. She was reappointed to carry out these same functions during the cabinet reshuffle of October 2, 2015, in the cabinet of Philemon Yang.
In 2016, she managed a budget of nearly 7 billion CFA francs (just over 10 million euros), a 21% increase from the previous year's amount.

On the third International Day of Children's Rights in 2016, she strongly opposed child marriage, which particularly affects girls by depriving them of education and deters their empowerment. She called on community and religious leaders, as well as journalists and heads of households, to fight against this practice and "other negative traditional practices."

Regarding delays in education and training of women, she advocated for a school construction policy, which she implemented with foreign funding including that of Japan. Her ministry supports vocational training centers for girls who have dropped out of school in rural areas. These centers offer programs such as information and communication technology (ICT) and project management, which enables the beneficiaries to work locally.

On April 19, 2012, a bill on the review of the electoral code of Cameroon was passed. It adopted measures to respect gender equality, resulting in an increase in the number of women parliamentarians from 25 to 56, enabling the country to achieve the goals set by the Convention for the Elimination of All Forms of Discrimination Against Women (CEDAW).

References 

1942 births
Cameroon People's Democratic Movement politicians
Women government ministers of Cameroon
Cameroonian pediatricians
People from Douala
Living people
21st-century Cameroonian women politicians
21st-century Cameroonian politicians